Marysia i Napoleon (Mary and Napoleon) is a Polish historical film. It was released in 1966. The film is set in two time periods: modern and historical.

Plot
A young French historian, Napoleon Beranger, comes to Warsaw on a foreign scholarship. While driving his car along a detour he runs into an old manor in Walewice village. On the wall of the manor he finds portraits of Napoleon Bonaparte and his great love Maria Walewska, a Polish aristocrat who used her charms to convince the emperor to stand up for her country. Beranger meets there by accident a beautiful woman, a student of art history by the same name of Maria Walewska (Marysia). The pair of modern heroes both notice the striking resemblance of each other to the historical figures, and as if by magic, move back into the Napoleonic period, where they play the roles of Napoleon and his Polish consort. They fall in love.

Main characters
Beata Tyszkiewicz - Maria Walewska/Marysia
Gustaw Holoubek - Napoleon Bonaparte/Napoleon Beranger
Juliusz Łuszczewski - Chamberlain Anastazy Walewski, uncle
Halina Kossobudzka - Princess Jabłonowska, Walewski sister
Ewa Krasnodębska - Anetka Potocka
Ignacy Machowski- Geraud Duroc
Kazimierz Rudzki - Charles-Maurice de Talleyrand-Périgord
Anna Ciepielewska - maid to Mrs Walewska Walewskiej / Marta
Bogumił Kobiela - valet Michael
Wieńczysław Gliński - Paweł Łączyński, Mrs. Walewska brother

References

External links
 

1966 films
Polish historical films
1960s Polish-language films
1960s historical films

Films set in 1883